Brazil competed at the 1984 Summer Paralympics in Stoke Mandeville, Great Britain and New York City, United States. 30 competitors from Brazil won 28 medals including 7 gold, 17 silver and 4 bronze and finished 24th in the medal table.

See also 
 Brazil at the Paralympics
 Brazil at the 1984 Summer Olympics

References 

Brazil at the Paralympics
1984 in Brazilian sport
Nations at the 1984 Summer Paralympics